Snowdon Hill Quarry is a 0.6 hectare geological Site of Special Scientific Interest on the western outskirts of Chard in Somerset, notified in 1963.

The site shows rock exposures through the Upper Greensand and Chalk which contain fossil crustaceans  which are both unique and exceptionally well-preserved and support study of palaeontology in Britain. The unit has been dated to the subdivision of the Chalk known as the Turrilites acutus Zone, named after one of the characteristic fossils.

References

External links
 English Nature website (SSSI information)

Sites of Special Scientific Interest in Somerset
Sites of Special Scientific Interest notified in 1963
Geology of Somerset
Quarries in Somerset
Chard, Somerset